Brendan C. Considine (21 February 1897 – 17 December 1983) was an Irish hurler, Gaelic footballer, rugby player and boxer who played as a left corner-forward for the Clare, Dublin, Cork and Waterford senior teams. He first played for Clare in 1914 and was a regular inter-county hurler until his retirement in 1930.

Part of the famous Considine family that included his brothers Willie and Tull, Considine is regarded as one of Clare's greatest-ever hurlers. He won two All-Ireland winners' medals, winning his first as a seventeen-year-old in 1914 making him the youngest player ever to win an All-Ireland title. He also won two Munster hurling medals, two Leinster hurling medals and one Leinster football medal.

At club level Considine is a multiple county club championship medalist with Ennis Dalcassians and Collegians.

References

1897 births
1983 deaths
Dual players
Ennis Dalcassians hurlers
UCD hurlers
Clare inter-county hurlers
Dublin inter-county hurlers
Cork inter-county hurlers
Waterford inter-county hurlers
Clare inter-county Gaelic footballers
Dublin inter-county Gaelic footballers
Munster inter-provincial hurlers
People from Ennis
All-Ireland Senior Hurling Championship winners